In American politics, "Sedition Caucus", "Treason Caucus", or "Seditious Caucus" is a pejorative term for the Republican members of the 117th United States Congress who voted against the certification of Joe Biden's victory in the 2020 presidential election in either Arizona or Pennsylvania. The vote occurred hours after rioters supporting incumbent president Donald Trump stormed the Capitol building to disrupt the vote. The term, referring to a Congressional caucus, does not refer to a formal group. Rather, it implies that the members of Congress who voted to object are in favor of or guilty of sedition, and had a direct or indirect role in the Capitol storming. It originated with the media, and has been used by political opponents of the Republicans, but also by scholars.

While the term was originally used to describe members of Congress who voted against the certification of the electoral vote in the 2020 presidential election, its use has since become somewhat broader (but still related to the aftermath of the 2021 Capitol attack). For example, it was used to describe the senators who voted "not guilty" in the second impeachment trial of Donald Trump.

Origins and use

Historical context 
Before the Electoral College certification vote, Donald Trump had attempted to overturn the results of the election for two months, promoting the Stop the Steal conspiracy theory that he had won, and filing dozens of lawsuits at the state level that were ruled against or dismissed. On December 2, 2020, Politico reported that Representative Mo Brooks of Alabama was planning to object to the counting of the electoral votes from several states won by Biden. On December 30, 2020, Senator Josh Hawley of Missouri became the first senator to announce he would object to the vote certification, meaning the objection would need to be considered by Congress.

Several Republican members of Congress who previously stated that they would object, including Senator Kelly Loeffler of Georgia, who had announced her intention to object at a campaign rally with Trump, chose not to do so following the Capitol riot. 

In April, Representative Liz Cheney, a Republican who did not vote to object to Biden's win, said she was considering a presidential run. She also indicated a belief that such objecting should be seen as "disqualifying" other presumptive Republican nominees, "particularly the senators who led the unconstitutional charge".

Reactions to the objections

Media and emergence of the term 
Even before the Capitol riot, some political commentators began using the term "Sedition Caucus". One of the earliest known uses of the term is from an Orlando Sentinel editorial on December 31, which noted that "about a dozen senators declared they're joining what's disparagingly being called the Sedition Caucus to overturn the election, despite Majority Leader Mitch McConnell's warnings against such a move." Another early use of the term is by CNN host Jake Tapper on January 3, who said "Senator Ben Sasse of Nebraska slammed Hawley and others of the Sedition Caucus saying, 'adults don't point a loaded gun at the legitimate government.'" The next day, The Atlantic published a column by Tom Nichols where he used the term, referencing Tapper. In a January 5 column entitled "A really bad day for the 'Sedition Caucus'", political columnist Jennifer Rubin used the term to refer to the group of senators, calling them "the 'Sedition Caucus'  or the 'Dirty Dozen', if you prefer."

Use of the term is highly critical. Conservative columnist Max Boot compared Sedition Caucus members to Senator Joseph McCarthy and he argued that they should similarly "see their careers crash and burn". Rubin argued that the senators should be expelled from the Senate or removed from the Republican caucus and Senators Ted Cruz, Josh Hawley, and John Kennedy should be disbarred, and that members of the House should be primaried or face third party opponents. Some members of the Sedition Caucus have faced calls for their resignation.

Political opponents 
In February, a Democratic super PAC called the Sedition Caucus PAC was formed to pursue negative campaigning against House Republicans in swing districts.

In June 2021, Democratic U.S. Representative Gerry Connolly used the term, saying he thought McCarthy "would probably appoint people from the Sedition Caucus" to a proposed January 6 commission.

Scholars 
Scholars have also used the term when analyzing the objections of these Republicans as a norm-breaking political phenomenon. Political scientist Sarah Binder noted that the majority of Sedition Caucus members come from very red districts, while Republicans in swing districts mostly voted against the objection. Binder also noted a divide between Senate Republican leadership, which overwhelmingly voted against the objection, and House Republican leadership, which overwhelmingly voted in favor of it, arguing that House Minority Leader Kevin McCarthy "led the Sedition Caucus" and attracted Republican votes to object.

Political scientist Hans Noel said he believed the Sedition Caucus and their "progenitors" come from a common strain of racism, comparing their beliefs to Barack Obama citizenship conspiracy theories, Shelby County v. Holder, poll taxes, literacy tests, and white primaries. Michael Latner, a political scientist with the Union of Concerned Scientists, argued that the Sedition Caucus showed the need for legislation aimed at curbing political power, such as the For the People Act and a renewal of the Voting Rights Act of 1965, as well as additional political parties and different voting systems.

Effect on political donations 

The outcry on the part of the public in reaction to the objecting votes influenced donors' willingness to fund those Republican candidates who became associated with the Sedition Caucus. On January 11, several major corporations pulled political funding for candidates who objected to Biden's victory. However, according to a Citizens for Responsibility and Ethics in Washington (CREW) report in June 2021, many of the corporations that had stopped donations after January 11 resumed them later in the year, with Toyota giving more than double that of the second-highest donor, Cubic Corporation.

On January 21, The Lincoln Project, a conservative but anti-Trump political action committee, announced it would begin targeting the Sedition Caucus in advertisements. 

On January 21, the progressive advocacy group Public Citizen published a report finding that Big Tech companies and employees had given nearly $2 million to Sedition Caucus members since 2016. On January 27, Public Citizen published a similar report finding that fossil fuel companies and executives had donated $8.8 million to Sedition Caucus members.

In July 2021, Toyota announced it would no longer donate to members of Congress who voted against certifying the 2020 election. Toyota again resumed donations in April 2022.

Other uses 
Following the events at the U.S. Capitol, the editorial board of The Capital Times, a newspaper in Madison, Wisconsin, argued that the Wisconsin Legislature has its own Sedition Caucus, referencing 15 state legislators who signed a letter to Vice President Mike Pence asking him to reject the Electoral College vote certification.

After the second impeachment trial of Trump in 2021, which was related to the insurrection, John Nichols used the term to instead describe the 43 Republican senators who voted not to convict Trump.

Members of Congress described by the term 
A total of 147 members of Congress voted in some form to invalidate the electoral college vote count of the 2020 presidential election: 139 in the House of Representatives, and 8 in the Senate.

Senate 
The eight Republican senators who would be part of the Sedition Caucus by the original definition include:

House of Representatives 
The 139 Republican members of the House of Representatives who would be part of the sedition caucus by the original definition include (alphabetically by each state):

See also
 Attempts to overturn the 2020 United States presidential election
 Freedom Caucus
 Republican efforts to restrict voting following the 2020 presidential election
 Republican reactions to Donald Trump's claims of 2020 election fraud
 United States House Select Committee on the January 6 Attack public hearings

Notes

References

117th United States Congress
2020 neologisms
January 6 United States Capitol attack
American political catchphrases
American political neologisms
Congressional scandals
Aftermath of the January 6 United States Capitol attack
Controversies of the 2020 United States presidential election
Members of the United States Congress
Political slurs
Political terminology of the United States
Republican Party (United States) terminology
Sedition
Terminology of the United States Congress
Terminology of the United States Senate
Trumpism
Political funding
Trump administration controversies
Presidency of Donald Trump